Murder on Middle Beach is a four-part documentary by director Madison Hamburg about the unsolved 2010 murder of his mother Barbara Hamburg. It premiered on November 15, 2020, on HBO.

Production
The documentary series began as a student film while Hamburg was in college.

Episodes

Reception
Ashlie Stevens of Salon remarked that the documentary differed from typical true crime documentaries in its personal story telling, writing "'Murder on Middle Beach' adds to the genre as well. It doesn't have a tidy ending, but grief rarely does. Filmmakers could learn a lot from how Madison Hamburg focuses on the emotional ripple effects of crime, and the very human toll that loss takes on a family and community."

Brian Tallerico of RogerEbert.com also remarked on the series' personal nature, stating "The greatest accomplishment of 'Murder on Middle Beach' is how connected I felt to this story by its end, concerned about an entire family torn apart because of one brutal day, in March over a decade ago."

References

2020s American documentary television series
True crime television series
2020 American television series debuts
Madison, Connecticut